Alireza Nasiri (born 21 March 1968) is an Iranian academic, businessman and technocrat. Nasiri played a leading role in establishing online degree programs in Iran, founding the first online degree program in University of Tehran and projects on e-government in Iran. He was general director of planning and development in Iran's Ministry of Cooperatives between 2004 and 2005 while also serving as acting Vice Minister.

He was on the board of directors of National Industrial (Melli) Shoe Co. and Darya Bandar Shipping Lines Co., among several other companies in Iran. Between 2011 and 2013 he was an instructor at Missouri State University Dalian Campus Nasiri is a senior business management and innovation lecturer at Global Institute of Management and Economics in DUFE.

He is currently on the board of directors of Aras GED which among other activities manages medium-sized commercial forests in Iran. Aras GED is also a consultant to large industrial companies on conducting business in Iran and the Middle East. The Tehran office of Aras GED Consulting is based out of the top floor of the SUNIR Co building in Taleghani Avenue adjacent to the former American Embassy in Tehran. In 2015 he supported investment and innovation in Iran's scientific fields as a means to create profitable business cycles in the Middle East. He also supported the cooperation of European companies with Iranian partners after the signing of the Iran nuclear deal.

Early life 
Alireza Nasiri was born in Iran and finished highschool in the city of Qazvin.

Education 
Nasiri graduated from Iran University of Science and Technology with a bachelor of Industrial Engineering in 1993 and began his profession as an industrial planner. In the 1990s the Iranian energy and engineering industry was just taking off, having to fill the vacuum left by the exit of companies such as Bechtel and withdrawal of American blue collar engineers from Iran such as Bell Engineers from the times of Richard Nixon, a large need for industrial engineers developed in Iran. Nasiri joined many others who studied at the University of Science and Technology by completing the Iranian Concours, the Iranian equivalent of the SAT.

In 2000 he acquired a M.Sc. in Executive Management from the Industrial Management Institute (IMI) of Iran in Tehran and started working as an executive manager specializing in industry and engineering. In 2010 he gained a PhD in Management Science and Engineering from the Dalian University of Technology in China and became an academic instructor with extensive experience in management and various industrial planning.

Career 
Nasiri began his career as an industrial planner in 1993 by working on industrial design projects. Later by 1999 he moved towards consulting and management, using his knowledge of industry and management techniques to improve the internal policy of industrial companies in Iran. He had a full-time career at the University of Tehran and often consulted companies in various industries and was appointed to several board of directors in those companies. Nasiri was among others part of a push to start a commercial ICT sector in Iran.

Since 1998 he worked as acting general manager in the University of Tehran Public Relations office until 1999, working as chief executive of the influential Tehran University Monthly Press (ماهنامه دانشگاه تهران). During that time he was also consultant to the chief executive officer at Melli National Industrial Shoes Co. and in 2000 became a member of the board at Melli Industrial Shoe. In the same period between 1999 and 2001 he consulted Hamid Rahmani in National Cultural Heritage, Handicrafts and Tourism Organization of Iran which is in charge of tourism and export of Iranian cultural products and is regarded as an autonomous Iranian government ministry.

In 2002 he shifted departments and his full-time job at University of Tehran changed to the General Director of Educational Support Department for Veteran Students, shortened as Isargaran, in the University of Tehran.

In 2003 he launched Iran's first online degree program based out of University of Tehran. In 2003 online degree programs were an unexplored subject in Iran and the Middle East, and Nasiri managed workshops on the launch and management of online degrees in Iran at the University of Tehran and the 1st National Exhibition on IT and launched the E-City project. In 2004 he became a member of board at Darya Bandar Shipping Lines Co. In the same year he exited the University of Tehran and started working full-time at the Ministry of Cooperatives as General Director of Planning and Development during the tenure of President Khatami. While serving as director of planning and development he was the acting vice minister in the absence of Bahman Salehi.

Commercializing Forestation in Iran 

After exiting the Ministry of Cooperatives in 2005 he began a PhD course on Management Science and Engineering in China, Dalian.

After completing his PhD in the city of Dalian he was impressed by Chinese city planning utilizing green spaces as both a decorative and commercial tool to fight pollution and soil damage in the coastal city of Dalian. He began a campaign to solve Iran's pollution, deforestation and green city planning problem using commercial forestation.

The effort would be supported by a series of greenhouses which produced genetically modified trees in a dozen locations across Iran. During this campaign Aras Green Economic Dawn, or Aras GED, was established to manage the commercialization of forestation in Iran and cut down on the import of paper into the country which amounted to a billion dollar industry in 2013.

The campaign had many setbacks in areas outside of Tehran, but for the most part has succeeded in making artificial forests commercially viable and profitable for forest owners in Iran. By creating economic value for forests with modified trees land owners would be part of a countrywide push towards commercial forestation.

Aras GED's commercial afforestation began in several large cities in Iran. Namely Tehran, Shiraz, Tabriz, Masshad, Bandar Abbas, Anzali and Ardebil. Artificial forests were also planted in less urban locations such as Janat Shahr.

The genetically modified nature of the trees made them both heat and chill resistant which was important in Iran's diverse weather environment. However Aras GED came up with a solution that would solve Iran's forest and pollution problem with a single tree that could be planted in the cold hills of Ardebil and also the hot valleys of Sistan and Baluchestan. Depending on a variety of factors from the ground's red soil content to moisture, the Aras GED tree grows anywhere between 2 and 3 meters in the first 7 months of planting.

Using experience gained in the first few years of the commercial forestation campaign in Iran, the company will start to provide a green environment warranty with every Aras GED tree sold across Iran in order to make commercial forestry in Iran more widespread.

Consulting in China 

Nasiri consulted several Iranian companies doing business in China and several Chinese companies doing business in Iran. Among these companies was Shiraz Metro which purchased rolling stock from China National Railway Company and its subsidiary in Dalian, DLRC. under an investment and sales agreement with the municipal government of Fars. Nasiri represented the Shiraz Metro company in Dalian.

Since 2016 Nasiri's consulting office is based out of the top floor of the SUNIR Co building. SUNIR Co is the 8th global private contractor for electricity transmission and distribution and is based in Tehran.

Board of directors
In 2000 he joined the board of directors at National Industrial Shoe Co.

In 2004 he served as a member of the board of directors at Darya Bandar Shipping Lines Co.

Alireza Nasiri is currently a member of the board at Aras GED.

See also 
Energy in Iran

Economic empowerment

Genetically modified trees

Supreme Council of ICT of Iran

Nasrollah Jahangard

Takfa

Iran University of Science and Technology

Commercialization of Renewable Energy

Afforestation

References 

Living people
Iranian businesspeople
Iranian consultants
1969 births